Ukrainian Women's Congress (укр. Український Жіночий Конгрес) — is a permanent public platform that defines the gender policy agenda for the Ukrainian Parliament, government, local communities, private and public sectors and media community. The Congress was established in 2017 by Equal Opportunities inter-party caucus. The event is organized by Ukrainian Women's Congress NGO.

Overview 
More than 500 active successful women and men from politics, business, civil society and media stood up for ensuring gender equality in the different sectors of Ukrainian society, seeing it as an essential element for ensuring the sustainable development of Ukraine.
The event’s goal is to unite society around the idea of equal opportunities and rights for women and men, and to become the permanent space for gender policy implementation in different sectors. 
National leaders, Ukrainian and foreign members of parliaments, representatives of international organizations, local authorities, Ukrainian and foreign experts took part in the discussions.

2017 
The first Ukrainian Women’s Congress took place on 22–23 November 2017 with the support of Equal Opportunities inter-party caucus.
The Prime Minister of Ukraine Volodymyr Hroysman spoke at the Congress  and more than 300 women and men took part in the event. Olena Kondratiuk, a member of parliament, greeted the participants: 

Seven discussion panels on reinforcing women’s participation in political and civic life at different levels, engaging women in peacekeeping and security sectors, eliminating gender-based violence and stereotypes and strengthening gender-sensitive education took place at the Congress. Government representatives, Ukrainian and foreign MPs, representatives of the international organizations and foreign and Ukrainian experts took part in the discussions.
Two photo exhibitions were hosted by the Congress – “Not women’s business” prepared within the Povaha campaign, standing against sexism in politics and media with the support of National Democratic Institute in partnership with Dobra Lystivka Fund, and “Women, Peace and Security in Ukraine”, initiated by Ukrainian Women’s Fund with the support of UN Women.

2018 
The second Ukrainian Women’s Congress took place on 7–8 December 2018. More than eighty leading Ukrainian and foreign speakers and more than 500 participants took part in nine discussion panels.

The then President of Ukraine Petro Poroshenko and the President of Lithuania Dalia Grybauskaitė participated in the Congress.

The participants discussed the problematic issues related to equal rights and opportunities policies in Ukraine, myths and stereotypes regarding women’s participation in different spheres of social life, implementation of institutional mechanisms for ensuring equality and nondiscrimination in making management decisions.

Ivanna Klympush-Tsintsadze, Vice-Prime-Minister for European and Euro-Atlantic Integration of Ukraine, stressed:

National leaders, representatives of executive authorities, international organizations, embassies of USA, Great Britain, Sweden, France, Spain, Canada, Norway, Lithuania, NGOs and civil society activists, female military officers, businesswomen and also men who actively support gender equality were invited to the Congress.

2019 
The third Ukrainian Women’s Congress took place on 10–11 December 2019 in Kyiv, becoming a platform for the high level discussion on equal rights and opportunities policies. The event brought together 700 participants from all over the world.

The Vice-Prime-Minister for European and Euro-Atlantic Integration of Ukraine Dmytro Kuleba, the Head of Ukrainian Parliament Dmytro Razumkov, Deputy-Head of Ukrainian Parliament Olena Kondratiuk, and the Head of the Supreme Court Valentyna Danishevska spoke at the Congress.

Olena Zelenska, the first lady of Ukraine, opened the event:

In her speech, the first lady of Ukraine expressed the idea of Ukraine joining the Biarritz Partnership, an international organization established at G7 summit in France.

Among the international speakers were Clare Hutchinson, the NATO Secretary General's Special Representative for Women, Peace and Security, Régis Brillat, the Special Adviser of the Secretary General of the Council of Europe for Ukraine, members of parliaments, representatives of foreign governments and embassies. The discussion raised the issues of engaging women in peacekeeping and security sectors, eliminating gender-based violence and stereotypes and strengthening gender-sensitive education.

2020 
Ukrainian Women’s Congress took place online for the first time on 23 July 2020. National leaders, governmental officials, representatives of international organizations, embassies of other countries, responsible businesses and NGOs were invited to the Congress.
Participants discussed the new challenges related to the COVID-19 epidemic and its impact on local elections in Ukraine, the role of political and civic leadership in fighting the pandemic and financial crisis.

Regional Ukrainian Women’s Congresses 
In 2018, Congresses took place in Odesa and Lviv and in 2019 - in Mariupol. The events raised the issues of gender equality in the regions and highlighted the problems of equal opportunities for women at the local level.

Ukrainian Women’s Congress in Odesa on 18 May 2018” brought together more than 60 participants from the South of Ukraine to discuss the developments and tasks related to gender policy at the local level.
NDI Ukraine Senior Country Director Mary O'Hagan, First Deputy Head of Verkhovna Rada Iryna Herashchenko, Ombudsman on Restoration of Peace in Donetsk and Luhansk regions Alyona Babak, MPs Svitlana Voytsekhovska, Maria Ionova and Olena Kondratiuk and also Minister of Communities and Territories Development Hennadiy Zubko and Head of Odesa Region Maksym Stepanov took part in the Congress.Ukrainian Women’s Congress took place in Lviv on 28 September 2018. More than 100 participants from Lviv, Ivano-Frankivsk, Ternopil, Chernivtsi, Kmelnytsky regions took part in the Congress. 
Participants from Donetsk, Zaporizhzhia and Luhansk regions were invited for the experience exchange. All of them represent local communities and authorities, state institutions or civil society. MPs Alyona Babak, Svitlana Voytsekhovska, Maria Ionova, Olena Kondratiuk who co-founded Equal Opportunities inter-party caucus, MPs Iryna Podolyak and Oksana Yurynets, the Vice-Prime-Minister for European and Euro-Atlantic Integration of Ukraine Ivanna Klympush-Tsintsadze, the Head of Lviv region Oleh Synyutka and the mayor of Lviv Andriy Sadovyi took part in the event.Ukrainian Women’s Congress took place on 7 June 2019 in Mariupol,'' initiated by Equal Opportunities inter-party caucus. 110 participants from Donetsk, Luhansk, Kharkiv, Zaporizhzhia, Kropyvnytskyi, Lviv and other regions took part in the panels and public discussions. 18 experienced speakers spoke at the Ukrainian Women’s Congress and voiced pressing issues related to gender policy, equal rights for men and women in security and defense sector, gender quotas, creating comfortable public spaces for everyone.

References

External links 
 
   
 
 

Government of Ukraine
Feminism in Ukraine